Sphenophorus nubilus is a species of beetle in the family Curculionidae. Because type specimens were unavailable, the name once was considered a junior synonym of Sphenophorus melanocephalus.

References

Dryophthorinae
Beetles described in 1838